Roy Ridge (21 October 1934 – December 2020) was an English footballer who played as a defender.

References

1934 births
2020 deaths
English footballers
Association football defenders
Rochdale A.F.C. players
Sheffield United F.C. players
English Football League players
Footballers from Sheffield